Victor Ehrenberg is the name of:

 Victor Ehrenberg (jurist) (1851–1929)
 Victor Ehrenberg (historian) (1891–1976)

See also 

 Ehrenberg (disambiguation)